The 1984–85 San Diego State Aztecs men's basketball team represented San Diego State University during the 1984–85 NCAA Division I men's basketball season. The Aztecs, led by sixth-year head coach Smokey Gaines, played their home games at the San Diego Sports Arena as members in the Western Athletic Conference.

After finishing a game behind UTEP in the conference regular season standings, San Diego State won the WAC tournament to earn an automatic bid to the NCAA tournament. As No. 13 seed in the West region, the Aztecs were defeated by UNLV in the opening round, 85–80. The team finished with a record of 23–8 (11–5 WAC).

Roster

Schedule and results

|-
!colspan=9 style=| Regular season

|-
!colspan=9 style=| WAC tournament

|-
!colspan=9 style=| NCAA tournament

Source

References

San Diego State Aztecs men's basketball seasons
San Diego State
San Diego State
San Diego State
San Diego State